Holcombe is a hamlet in the district of East Devon in the English county of Devon.

Holcombe is located northwest of the town of Lyme Regis about a mile west of Uplyme. The Iron Age "Holcombe Mirror", now in the British Museum, was found on a farm here in 1970 by Devon Archaeological Society when excavating the site of a Roman villa.

References

External links

Villages in Devon